Tabarin was the street name assumed by the most famous of the Parisian street charlatans, Anthoine Girard.

Tabarin or Bel Tabarin may also refer to:

Bal Tabarin (Paris), a historic Paris nightclub
Bimbo's 365 Club, a San Francisco entertainment venue formerly known as Bal Tabarin
Operation Tabarin, the codename under which the British Antarctic Survey originated in 1944
Tabarin Peninsula in Antarctica, named after the operation

Media
Bal Tabarin (film), a 1952 film featuring Argentina Brunetti
Tabarin, an 1885 opera by Émile Pessard
"Tabarin", a 1951 song by The Hollywood Flames
Tabarin (film), a 1958 film starring Sylvia Lopez